Suman Raj Pyakurel (Nepali: सुमन राज प्याकुरेल) is a Nepalese communist politician and member of the National Assembly. In 2018, he was elected unopposed in Province No. 2 for the Communist Party of Nepal (Unified Marxist–Leninist) with a four-year term.

In 2013, he ran for the Constituent Assembly election for the Communist Party of Nepal (Unified Marxist–Leninist).

References 

Living people
Nepal Communist Party (NCP) politicians
Members of the National Assembly (Nepal)
Communist Party of Nepal (Unified Marxist–Leninist) politicians
Year of birth missing (living people)